The 2009 Continental Indoor Football League season was the league's fourth overall season. The regular season began on Friday, March 6. The league champion was the Chicago Slaughter.

Standings

Playoffs

2009 award winners
CIFL Most Valuable Player - Russ Michna, Chicago Slaughter
Offensive Player of the Year - Russ Michna, Chicago Slaughter
Defensive Player of the Year - Bryceon Lawrence, Marion Mayhem
Special Teams Player of the Year -
Coach of the Year - Matt Land, Fort Wayne Freedom

External links
 CIFL Website